The 56th edition of the Vuelta a Guatemala was held from 24 October to 1 November 2016.

Teams
Twelve teams entered the race. Each team had a maximum of six riders.

Route

Result

References

Guatemala
Guatemala
Vuelta a Guatemala